Francesco Ubertini may refer to:

 Francesco Bacchiacca (1494–1557), Italian painter
 Francesco Ubertini (engineer) (born 1970), rector of the University of Bologna